The 1979 NAIA Men's Ice Hockey Tournament involved eight schools playing in single-elimination bracket to determine the national champion of men's NAIA college ice hockey. The 1979 tournament was the 12th men's ice hockey tournament to be sponsored by the NAIA.   The tournament began on February 23, 1979 and ended with the championship game on February 25, 1979.

Bracket
St. Paul Civic Center, St. Paul, Minnesota

Note: * denotes overtime period(s)

References

External links 
 NAIA ice hockey

Ice
NAIA Men's Ice Hockey Championship
NAIA Ice Hockey Championship 
NAIA Ice Hockey Championship